The Band Camino (stylized as The Band CAMINO) is an American rock band. Established in Memphis, Tennessee, in 2015, the group is now based in Nashville.

History
Andrew Isbell, Jeffery Jordan, Graham Rowell, and Spencer Stewart established the Band Camino in 2015 while the four were students at the University of Memphis. Isbell played drums, Rowell served as bassist, and Jordan and Stewart shared guitar and vocal duties. The band began by releasing their first EP in 2016 titled My Thoughts On You. Their second EP, Heaven, was released in 2017; Isbell left the band around this time and was replaced by Garrison Burgess.

By May 2019, the Band Camino had signed to Elektra Records; their first release for the label, an EP titled tryhard, was available on August 23. Ahead of the EP's release, four of its songs were released: "Daphne Blue", "See Through", "Honest" and "What I Want". To promote the release, the group embarked on a headlining tour of North America from September through October, plus two dates in the United Kingdom. On April 9, 2020, bassist Graham Rowell was removed from the group after accusations of sexual misconduct between him and fans surfaced online. The group released their first song from their upcoming self titled album, "Roses", on December 11, 2020. This was followed by "1 Last Cigarette" on February 26, 2021, "Sorry Mom" on April 30, and "Know It All" on June 25. Their self titled debut album was released on September 10, 2021. In December, it was announced that the Band Camino would play at the Hangout Fest in May 2022. A radio edit version of "I Think I Like You" was released on April 26, 2022, and received heavy rotation on SiriusXM.

Musical style
Timothy Monger at Allmusic describes the Band Camino's musical approach as a blend of indie rock and electropop. Stewart has self-described the band as "rock-pop".

Band members
Jeffery Jordan – vocals, guitar (2015–present)
Spencer Stewart – vocals, guitar (2015–present)
Garrison Burgess – drums (2017–present), bass (2020–present)
Former
Andrew Isbell – drums (2015–2017)
Graham Rowell – bass (2015–2020)

Discography

Tryhard (Elektra, 2019)
The Band Camino (Elektra, 2021)

EPs

My Thoughts On You (2016)
Heaven (2017)

References

External links 

 

2015 establishments in Tennessee
Alternative rock groups from Tennessee
Elektra Records artists
Musical groups from Memphis, Tennessee
Musical groups established in 2015